Wages of Virtue is a 1924 American silent drama film directed by Allan Dwan and written by Forrest Halsey and Percival Christopher Wren. The film stars Gloria Swanson, Ben Lyon, Norman Trevor, Ivan Linow, Armand Cortes, Adrienne D'Ambricourt, and Paul Panzer. The film was released on November 10, 1924, by Paramount Pictures. It was shot at the Astoria Studios in New York.
 
It is based on a novel by Percival Christopher Wren, best known as the author of Beau Geste. Like that story, Wages of Virtue is based around the French Foreign Legion, and an Italian woman who runs a café in Algiers frequented by the Legionnaires.

Plot
As described in a review in a film magazine, Luigi (Linow), a strong man, head of a small show, saves the life of a young woman, Carmelita (Swanson), and persuades her to join his company. His assistant, Giuseppe (Cortes), arouses his jealousy and he kills him. To escape the police, Luigi leaves, taking Carmelita with him, and they finally land in a garrison town in Algiers. Luigi joins the French Foreign Legion and installs Carmelita as proprietress of a cafe which attracts the soldiers. Among them is an American, Marvin (Lyon), who falls in love with her, but she is held to Luigi by gratitude until she learns that he is planning to marry Madame Cantiniere (D'Ambricourt), a widow who runs another cafe. Luigi, jealous of Marvin, frames him and he is punished by the military authorities. Later they have a fight and Marvin is being overpowered when Carmelita stabs him. The soldiers, who love her, spread the report that he was killed in a fight with an Arab, and Carmelita and Marvin find happiness together.

Cast

Preservation
With no prints of Wages of Virtue located in any film archives, it is a lost film.

References

Bibliography
 Frederic Lombardi. Allan Dwan and the Rise and Decline of the Hollywood Studios. McFarland, 2013.

External links

Still at the Gloria Swanson website

1924 films
1920s English-language films
Silent American drama films
1924 drama films
Paramount Pictures films
Films directed by Allan Dwan
American black-and-white films
Lost American films
American silent feature films
Films shot at Astoria Studios
Films set in Algiers
Films about the French Foreign Legion
1924 lost films
Lost drama films
1920s American films